Galkot Durbar is a historical palace located in Galkot, Gandaki Province, Nepal. 

It was built by the Kingdom of Galkot, a petty kingdom in the confederation of 24 states known as Chaubisi Rajya.

Historical documents from the palace were looted by Maoists during the Nepalese Civil War. Galkot Durbar is currently in a neglected stage. 

Galkot Durbar has been described as "Galkot's crown jewels".

References 

Buildings and structures in Baglung District
Palaces in Nepal
Tourist attractions in Gandaki Province